André of Neufchâteau (died c. 1400) was a scholastic philosopher of the fourteenth century. He was a Franciscan from Lorraine, who wrote a number of works. He earned the name Doctor Ingeniosissimus (most ingenious Doctor).

In philosophy he opposed Nicholas of Autrecourt, and also the nominalist Augustinian Gregory of Rimini. On the dependence of natural law on divine will he followed Pierre d'Ailly.

His Sentences commentary was printed in Paris in 1514.

References

Hubert Elie (1936), Le complexe significabile, thèse de doctorat, published by Vrin as Le signifiable complexe with Appendix on André de Neufchâteau
Janine Marie Idziak (translator and editor), Questions on an Ethics of Divine Commands. Andrew of Neufchateau OFM, Notre Dame Texts in Medieval Culture 3 (Notre Dame 1997)
Peter Houston, editor, Primum Scriptum Sententiarum

Notes

French Franciscans
Scholastic philosophers
14th-century French philosophers
French male writers
14th-century French writers
14th-century Latin writers